Georgallis is a surname. Notable people with the surname include:

Steve Georgallis (born 1968), Australian rugby league footballer and coach
Ioannis Georgallis (born 1983), Greek basketball player

Greek-language surnames